Malek Maktabi (or Malik Maktaby, born in Beirut on 10 November 1981) is a Lebanese television presenter who is known for hosting Ahmar Bil Khatt Al Aarid (Red in Boldface), a weekly talk show about social and human issues, which runs on the Lebanese Broadcasting Corporation (LBC) TV network.

Personal life
Maktabi married politician and newspaper heiress Nayla Tueni, daughter of assassinated Gebran Tueni, on August 2009, in a civil ceremony in Cyprus. Their marriage came as a surprise to most people at the time, as the couple had kept both their relationship and engagement secret.

They currently have three children together. Their eldest son Gebran Malek Maktabi (born 2010) followed by their second son Sharif Malek Maktabi (born 2013) and their first daughter and youngest child Noor (born 2015).

Career
Maktabi has a Ph.D in international affairs and diplomacy, completed in London. In early 2009, he hosted the Miss Lebanon 2009 pageant on LBC, and appeared with Marcel Ghanem on the talk show Kalam El Nass, also on LBC.

References

21st-century journalists
Lebanese Shia Muslims
Living people
Lebanese television presenters
Lebanese Muslims
1981 births
People from Beirut
Lebanese American University alumni
Lebanese journalists